Wicked Wisdom is the second studio album by American nu metal band Wicked Wisdom. Released on February 21, 2006, by Jada Pinkett Smith's production company 100% Womon and Suburban Noize Records, Will Smith served as the project's executive producer. The album made it to Billboard's Top Heatseekers chart, and peaked at number 44 during the week of March 11, 2006. Allmusic reviewer Alex Henderson said of the album, "[Pinkett Smith] shows herself to be an expressive, commanding singer" and that "[Wicked Wisdom] shows considerable promise". The band promoted the album in 2006, touring with heavy metal band Sevendust.

Track listing
All Songs Written By Jada Koren, Pocket Honore & Cameron Graves
 Yesterday Don't Mean - 2:29
 Something Inside of Me - 3:34
 One - 2:43
 Bleed All Over Me - 3:19
 Cruel Intentions - 3:27
 You Can't Handle - 3:09
 Forgiven - 4:27
 Set Me Free - 4:54
 Don't Hate Me - 2:40
 Reckoning - 2:36

Personnel
Jada Koren - vocals, bellows
Pocket Honore - guitar, vocals
Cameron Graves - guitar, keyboards
Rio - bass guitar, vocals
Philip Fisher - drums, percussion

Production
Produced By Ulrich Wild, Jay Baumgardner & Pocket Honore
Recorded & Engineered By Dan Certa, Sergio Chavez & Ulrich Wild
Mixed By Jay Baumgardner
Digital Editing: Dan Certa, Sergio Chavez
Mastered By UE Nastasi

References

Wicked Wisdom albums
Albums produced by Ulrich Wild
Suburban Noize Records albums
Interscope Records albums